Finbar and Eddie Furey is the 1968 debut album of the Irish folk music duo the Fureys. It includes such classics as "Curragh of Kildare", "Come by the Hills", "Eamonn an Chnuic", and Shay Healy's topical song "This Town is Not Our Own", among others.

1968 debut albums
The Fureys albums
Transatlantic Records albums